WIDA-FM (90.5 MHz, Vida FM) is a radio station broadcasting a Religious radio format. Licensed to Carolina, Puerto Rico, it serves the Puerto Rico area.  The station is currently owned by Radio Vida Incorporado.

External links

IDA-FM
Carolina, Puerto Rico